Crossett High School is a comprehensive public high school in Crossett, Arkansas, United States. It is one of two public high schools located in Ashley County, and the sole high school administered by the Crossett School District.

In addition to Crossett the district, and therefore the school, also serves West Crossett and most of North Crossett.

Academics

Curriculum
The assumed course of study that students complete is the Smart Core curriculum developed by the Arkansas Department of Education (ADE), which requires students to complete 22 units prior to graduation. Students complete regular and Advanced Placement (AP) coursework and exams. The school is accredited as a 1924 charter member of AdvancED. In 1963, educator Simmons McClintock was honored by the ADE as the 'Arkansas Teacher of the Year'.

Awards and recognition
In 2011, Crossett School District and its high school were recognized in the AP District of the Year Awards program in the College Board's 2nd Annual Honor Roll that consisted of 367 U.S. public school districts (4 in Arkansas) that simultaneously achieved increases in access to AP® courses for a broader number of students and improved the rate at which their AP students earned scores of 3 or higher on an AP Exam.

In 2012, Crossett School District and its high school were recognized in the AP District of the Year Awards program in the College Board's 3rd Annual Honor Roll that consisted of 539 U.S. public school districts (6 in Arkansas) that simultaneously achieved increases in access to AP® courses for a broader number of students and improved the rate at which their AP students earned scores of 3 or higher on an AP Exam.

Extracurricular activities
The Crossett High School mascot is the eagle with maroon and white serving as the school colors. For 2012–present, the Crossett Eagles compete in the 4A classification administered by the Arkansas Activities Association in the 4A Region 8 Conference. The Eagles compete with interscholastic teams in baseball, basketball (boys/girls), football, golf (boys/girls), fast-pitch softball, speech, tennis (boys/girls), track and field (boys/girls), the cheer squad, and the Eaglette dance squad.

The Crossett Eagles have more than 50 state championships. In boys track and field, the Eagles have won over 25 state titles including twice winning seven consecutive banners between 1975–81 and 1983–89.

 3x Football: 1966, 1978, 1984
 1x Boys Basketball: 1968
 2x Baseball: 1997, 1993
 29x Boys Track & Field: 1958–59, 1967–69, 1975–81, 1983–89, 1991, 1994, 1998, 2002–03, 2016, 2018
 7x Girls Track & Field: 1988, 1990–91, 1997, 2000, 2012,2014
 5x Boys Cross Country: 1983–84, 1986–87, 1996
 5x Decathlon: 1972, 1978–79, 1996–97
 1x Boys Golf: 1954
 5x Girls Tennis: 1984–86, 1991, 1993
 6x Boys Swimming and Diving: 1950, 1952–53, 1956–58

In addition to sports, Crossett students may seek participation in clubs and organizations, such as: Future Farmers of America (FFA), Health Occupation Students of America (HOSA), Student Council, Yearbook, and honor societies.

Notable people

 Jessie Clark (1978)—Former professional football player
 Jeremy Evans (2006)—Professional basketball player
 Keith Kidd, American football player
 Bryant Nelson, MLB Player
 Rylan Reed (1999)—Former football and baseball player
 Barry Switzer (1955)—College Football Hall of Fame inductee; 3x national champion at University of Oklahoma, 1995 Super Bowl champion coach

References

External links
 

Public high schools in Arkansas
Schools in Ashley County, Arkansas